Santolaya is one of seven parishes (administrative divisions) in Morcín, a municipality within the province and autonomous community of Asturias, in northern Spain.

Villages
 Les Bolíes
 El Brañuitu
 Calvín
 Figares
 La Llorera
 Malpica
 La Partayera
 Santolaya
 Les Vallines
 El Molín de Figares

References

Parishes in Morcin